Actinoplanes luteus is a bacterium from the genus Actinoplanes which has been isolated from forest soil from Lamphun, Thailand.

References 

Micromonosporaceae
Bacteria described in 2015